Lieutenant-General Sir William Russell, 2nd Baronet (5 April 1822 – 19 March 1892), was a British Army officer who served in the Crimean War and in the suppression of the Indian Rebellion of 1857, and then became a Liberal Party politician. He was a Member of Parliament (MP) for Dover from 1857 to 1859, and for Norwich from 1860 to 1874.

Early life 
Russell was the son of Sir William Russell, 1st Baronet of Charlton Park (1773–1839) and his second wife Jane Eliza Russell, daughter of Major-General James Dodington Sherwood.

Military career 
Russell entered the army as a Cornet in 1841, became a Lieutenant in February 1846, a captain in April 1857, a Major in August 1857, a lieutenant-colonel in November 1858, and colonel in July 1863.

In April 1854, Sir William of the 7th Hussars was appointed as Aide-de-Camp to the Earl of St Germans, Lord Lieutenant of Ireland. He served in the Crimean War and during the Indian Rebellion of 1857 he served at Alumbagh and at the Siege of Lucknow, and commanded the 7th Hussars on further operations in India and Nepal. He received a medal and clasp, and was made a Companion of the Order of the Bath (CB) in 1859.

Political career 
He was elected at the 1857 general election as a Member of Parliament (MP) for Dover, but lost the seat at the 1859 general election. He returned to the House of Commons the following year when he was elected at a by-election in March 1860 as one of the two MPs for Norwich, after an election petition had led to the 1859 election in Norwich being declared void. He was re-elected in 1865 and in 1868, and held the seat until he retired from Parliament at the 1874 general election.

Family 

In 1863, Russell married Margaret Wilson, the only child of Robert Wilson. By 1870 they had two children: William (born 28 Sept 1865) and Margaret Jane (born 21 August 1867). They are buried at Highgate Cemetery

Titles 
Russell succeeded to his father's baronetcy in 1839, and on his death in 1892, aged 69, he was succeeded in the title by his own son William Russell (1865–1915), on whose death the title became extinct.

References

Further reading 
''Dictionary of National Biography, Russell, Sir William (1822–1892), lieutenant-general, by E. M. Lloyd. Published 1897.

External links 
 

1822 births
1892 deaths
Burials at Highgate Cemetery
Liberal Party (UK) MPs for English constituencies
UK MPs 1857–1859
UK MPs 1859–1865
UK MPs 1865–1868
UK MPs 1868–1874
Baronets in the Baronetage of the United Kingdom
British Army personnel of the Crimean War
7th Queen's Own Hussars officers
Companions of the Order of the Bath